The Renault Nepta was a  concept grand tourer made by Renault which was presented at the Mondial de l'Automobile 2006. It was designed by  Patrick le Quément and was unusual for Renault in that it was rear-wheel drive with a large petrol engine.

Technical details

It is equipped with a direct injection twin turbo 3.5 L petrol V6 producing  and was coupled to a paddle-shift seven-speed automatic gearbox. The Nepta could accelerate to 62 mph in 4.9 seconds.

References

External links
 

Nepta
Cars introduced in 2006
Rear-wheel-drive vehicles
Grand tourers
Convertibles
Automobiles with gull-wing doors